George Sinker (5 May 1900 – 19 January 1986) was bishop of Nagpur and provost of Birmingham Cathedral.

He was born in Hyderabad, India, the son of the Reverend R Sinker, and was educated at Rossall School and Brasenose College, Oxford. In 1924 he married Eva Margaret, daughter of Colonel C H Madden OBE MC.

He served as a missionary for the Church Missionary Society in Kandy and Ceylon starting in 1921. In 1924 he was ordained in Bannu, North West Frontier Province, India. He moved to Peshawar in 1932. He was appointed headmaster of the Bishop Cotton School, Simla, in 1935, then canon of the Cathedral Church of the Resurrection, Lahore, 1944, and general secretary of the Bible Society for India and Ceylon in 1947. He was consecrated bishop of Nagpur in 1949.

On his return to the United Kingdom, he was successively Vicar of Bakewell (and an Assistant Bishop of Derby) from 1954 to 1962 and Provost of Birmingham Cathedral (and an Assistant Bishop of Birmingham) from 1962 to 1972. He died in Macclesfield in 1986.

Publications

Jesus loved Martha, Hodder and Stoughton, 1949.
What was Jesus doing on the Cross?, India, 1952
His Very Words, Hodder and Stoughton, 1953

References

1900 births
1986 deaths
Scholars from Hyderabad, India
Alumni of Brasenose College, Oxford
20th-century Church of England clergy
Provosts and Deans of Birmingham
Indian Anglican priests
People educated at Rossall School
Anglican bishops of Nagpur